Noble is the given name of the following people:

 Noble Craig (died 2018), American actor and Vietnam War veteran
 Noble Doss (1920–2009), American National Football League halfback
 Noble S. Elderkin (1810–1875), American politician
 Noble Jones Gregory (1897–1971), American politician
 Noble Foster Hoggson (1865-?), American builder, architect and author
 Noble A. Hull (1827–1907), American politician
 Noble Johnson (1881–1978), African-American actor and film producer
 Noble J. Johnson (1887–1968), American politician and judge
 Noble Jones (1702–1775), one of the first settlers of the Province of Georgia and one of its leading officials
 Noble Wimberly Jones (c. 1723–1805), American physician and statesman, son of the above
 Noble Jorgensen (1925–1982), American basketball player
 Noble Kizer (1900–1940), American football and basketball player, football coach and college athletics administrator
 Noble L. Mitchell (1854–1932), American politician and lawyer
 Noble C. Powell (1891–1968), American Episcopal bishop
 Noble Sissle (1889–1975), American jazz composer, lyricist, bandleader, singer and playwright
 Noble Threewitt (1911–2010), American Thoroughbred racehorse trainer
 Noble Villeneuve (born 1938), Canadian former politician
 Noble "Thin Man" Watts (1926–2004), American blues, jump blues and rhythm-and-blues saxophonist
 Noble Willingham (1931–2004), American actor